Matthias Zimprecht (ca. 1624 – 1680), native Bavarian, was a Bohemian painter, active in Prague from mid-1650s till 1680. His known work consists mostly of altar pieces but he was also a sought-after portraitist and author of gallery paintings.

Life
Matthias Zimprecht (1624 Munich – 1680 Prague), in written sources named also Simbrecht, Simprecht, Zimbrecht, Cymprecht, Cymbrecht, Cimprecht, Sinbrecht, Cympret, Cimbert, was the eldest son of an employee at the elector's court Peter Zimprecht in Munich, trained at the court painter there Kaspar Amort (1612–1675). After 1646 he set out on the journeyman's path (he is proved in 1650 in Graz), he stayed in Italy, where under the influence of contemporary Roman painting (Pietro da Cortona) he finished shaping his artistic expression. From 1655, he is documented in Prague, where he worked until 1667 in the services of Count Wenzel Michna of Vacínov (Waitzenhofen) as a private painter. After the death of his patron, he settled in Prague's New Town and became the head of the painters’ guild there. From that time, it is possible to observe his painting activity more coherently – he supplied altarpieces for the churches there, but even in Lesser Town, he was also the author of portraits and very highly regarded gallery pieces, on which we unfortunately with some exceptions find out about from collection inventory lists.

Oeuvre
With his colorfully vivid, truly Baroque expression, strongly marked by Italian (Cortona-like) painting, Zimprecht headed further than his Bohemian contemporaries Anton Stevens or Johann Friedrich Hess and simultaneously he represented an antipode to the more concentrated in expression and more dramatic in light Karel Škréta. With his death in the Great Plague Epidemic in 1680, epoch of the first creators of the Baroque art in Prague and Bohemia ends, his work represents a link to the generation emerging in the last decades of the 17th century, Johann Georg Heinsch, Johann Rudolf Byss, Johann Christoph Liška and Michael Wenzel Halbax.

Gallery

References

Bibliography
 Štěpán Vácha and Radka Heisslerová, Ve stínu Karla Škréty. Pražští malíři v letech 1635–1680. Antonín Stevens, Jan Bedřich Hess, Matěj Zimprecht [= In the Shadow of Karel Škréta. Prague Painters in 1635–1680. Anton Stevens, Johann Friedrich Hess, Matthias Zimprecht]. Prague: Academia, 2017. 
 Štěpán Vácha and Radka Heisslerová, Pražský malíř Matěj Zimprecht (1624–1680). Životopis umělce v limitech historické paměti [= Prague painter Matthias Zimprecht (1624–1680): Biography of an Artist within the Scope of Collective Memory ]. In: Umění/Art Vol. 60, 2012, pp. 255–280. 
 Allgemeine Deutsche Biographie 45. Zeisberger–Zyrl, Nachtrag bis 1899: von Abendroth–Anderssen, Leipzig: Duncker & Humblot, 1900, pp. 577–578.

External links

1624 births
1680 deaths
17th-century Bohemian people
17th-century painters
Baroque painters
Czech painters
Czech male painters
Czech baroque painters
Artists from Prague
German painters